The Chinamococh stream frog (Quilticohyla sanctaecrucis) is a species of frog in the family Hylidae endemic to Guatemala. Its natural habitats are subtropical or tropical moist lowland forests and rivers. It is threatened by habitat loss.

References

Quilticohyla
Endemic fauna of Guatemala
Amphibians of Guatemala
Frogs of North America
Critically endangered fauna of North America
Amphibians described in 1992
Taxa named by Jonathan A. Campbell
Taxonomy articles created by Polbot